The discography of Korean-American singer Son Ho-young includes two studio albums and three EPs. He debuted in 1999 as a member of pop music group g.o.d and went solo in 2006.

Studio albums

Extended plays

Singles

As lead artist

As featured artist

Contributed songs

As lead artist

As featured artist

Soundtracks

Charted songs

  Chart information is from the Gaon Digital Chart only.
  Sales figures are from the Gaon Download Chart.

Music videos

Appearances

References

External links
Discography on Naver Music

Discographies of South Korean artists
Pop music discographies
Rhythm and blues discographies